The 1970 Furman Paladins football team was an American football team that represented Furman University as a member of the Southern Conference (SoCon) during the 1970 NCAA University Division football season. In their thirteenth season under head coach Bob King, Furman compiled a 8–3 record, with a mark of 3–2 in conference play, placing third in the SoCon.

Schedule

References

Furman
Furman Paladins football seasons
Furman Paladins football